Ectoedemia arisi is a moth of the family Nepticulidae. It was described by Puplesis in 1984. It is known from the Russian Far East and Japan.

References

Nepticulidae
Moths of Japan
Moths of Asia
Moths described in 1984